Xue Chaohua (born 31 March 1992) is a Chinese road and track cyclist, who currently rides for UCI Continental team . He won the gold medal in the team pursuit at the 2016 Asian Cycling Championships.

Major results

2019
 1st  Road race, National Road Championships

References

External links

1992 births
Living people
Chinese track cyclists
Chinese male cyclists
Cyclists from Beijing
Asian Games medalists in cycling
Asian Games gold medalists for China
Cyclists at the 2018 Asian Games
Medalists at the 2018 Asian Games
20th-century Chinese people
21st-century Chinese people